The 2005–06 Martyr's Memorial A-Division League season, also known as the Martyr's Memorial San Miguel League for sponsorship reasons, was the 36th season of the A-Division League since its establishment in 1954/55. A total of 14 teams competed in the league. Manang Marsyangdi Club won the league. The season began on 26 August 2005 and concluded on 21 February 2006.

Teams 
APF Club made their debut in the league without being promoted before.

League table

Match-fixing controversy 
On matchday 27, relegation-threatened Machhindra FC faced Ranipokhari Corner Team. After the match ended 9-8 for Machhindra, allegations of match fixing rose, as Machhindra needed the win while RCT's Rishi Rai, who scored all eight goals, was on course to become the league's top goalscorer. While the analysis on the allegations never concluded, All Nepal Football Association did not award the top goalscorer award this season.

References 

Martyr's Memorial A-Division League seasons
Nepal